Die Lösung (The Solution) is an album by Amon Düül (UK) recorded in 1988 and released as an LP (DemiMonde DMLP 1015) in 1989.

It is one of several recordings made in Wales by two original members of Amon Düül II, John Weinzierl (guitar) and  bassist Dave Anderson (also ex-Hawkwind). Other musicians on this album include the drummer Guy Evans, best known for his earlier work with Van der Graaf Generator, plus Ed Wynne and Joie Hinton from Ozric Tentacles. Most of the songs were co-written by Robert Calvert and feature his voice; however, the last two have lead vocals by Julie Wareing.

Track listing
 "Big Wheel"
 "Urban Indian"
 "Adrenalin Rush"
 "Visions of Fire"
 "Drawn to the Flame"
 "They Call It Home"
 "Die Lösung"

The CD reissue (Magnum Music Group CDTL 009) also includes an alternate version of Drawn to the Flame. On this release original album version of the song is named "Dawn to the Flame (part 1)" and bonus track as "Dawn to the Flame (part 2)"

References

1989 albums
Amon Düül II albums